Flinder Boyd (born 12 February 1980) is a retired British basketball player born in California to British parents.

College career
Boyd played college basketball at Dartmouth College scoring 1026 points and recording 585 assists over his four-year career. He holds both the Dartmouth single game (16) and career assist records.

Professional career
Boyd started his professional career in France in the Ligue Nationale de Basket where he played for STB Le Havre, ALM Évreux Basket, FC Mulhouse Basket and Hermine de Nantes Atlantique. He would then move to CI Rosalía de Castro of Spain for a two-year spell before moving to Britain to play for British Basketball League teams Leicester Riders and the Newcastle Eagles. In 2010 Boyd returned to Spain to play for Ourense. During the 2010–11 season he played with BC Prievidza in Slovakia and AEK Athens BC of Greece.

International
Boyd has made 34 appearances for the Great Britain national basketball team and competed in the 2009 Eurobasket championship in Poland.

References

1980 births
Living people
AEK B.C. players
Basketball players from California
BC Prievidza players
British men's basketball players
Club Ourense Baloncesto players
Dartmouth Big Green men's basketball players
Leicester Riders players
Newcastle Eagles players
STB Le Havre players
Sportspeople from Los Angeles County, California
American men's basketball players
Point guards